Thozhudur, (meaning "village of worship"), are twin towns decorated by Vellar River in Cuddalore District, Tamil Nadu, India.

Thozhudur is well served by government institutions like schools, post office, etc. Other private educational institutes like schools and colleges serve people.  All major hotels, banks, shopping center, bus stands, marriage halls, a petrol/diesel/gas station are located on Ramanatham highway whereas Tholudur is popularly known for its traditional houses.

People often refer Ramanatham bus stand as Tholudur stop, however, Tholudur is 1 km away from this stop. This is due to British rule as during their time they referred to this place as Tholudur instead of Ramanatham. For locals - it's a twin town.

The main occupation of the people is agriculture. Rice, sugarcane, groundnut and other cereals are generally cultivated. Nature so loved this village that it gave a river, lake, green pastures and lovely people.

Cricket and badminton are the favorite sports and tournaments have been conducted for decades.

The higher secondary school boasts different varieties of trees. Nearby is a Chivan (Sivan) temple with inscriptions of Chola dynasty.

Location

Thozhudur towns are located on the banks of Vellar River.  Ramanatham is situated on NH 45 the highway connecting the state capital Chennai and Trichycities - Tholudur is 1 km from Ramanatham main road.  Also it is 15 km far from the nearest town panchayat Tittakudi which is also its Taluk. Ramanatham - Tholudur is 246 km away from Chennai and 76 km away from Trichy.

Government institutions

Thozhudur
 Primary Health Centre
 Higher Secondary School(with cricket ground) 
 Girls' High School 
 Post Office 
 Registrar Office 
 Veterinary hospital 
 PDS centre 
 Co-operative bank

Ramanatham
 Indian Bank
 Aadhar Card Center
 Police Station
 TN Govt Electricity Board
 Bus Stand for all Bus to stop
 Petrol/Gas Stations
 Govt cottages
 Panchayat owned Marriage Hall

Festivals

All gods reside here and are celebrated. Each temple has its own festivals.

Thai Pongal is the major festival lasting four days.
 Bhogi is celebrated without pollution and tummy full of eatable like kozhukattai, El-Urundai, etc.
 Pongal is for actual delicious pongal.
 Mattu Pongal is for cattle that are decorated and fed delicious pongal. 
 Kaanum Pongal is to see people and play on the riverbed. This day is for non-veg specials.
Deepavali(Diwali), Ramzan and Christmas are other festivals celebrated.

References

Villages in Cuddalore district